Cold Night may refer to:

Cold Night, novel by Al Sarrantonio
"Cold Night", a song by The Folk Implosion from the album Dare to Be Surprised, 1997 
Cold Night (You Me at Six song), 2014